Forgetting June is a 2013 Nigerian romantic drama film directed by Ikechukwu Onyeka, starring Majid Michel, Beverly Naya, and Mbong Amata.

Cast
Majid Michel - Eddie
Beverly Naya - Tobi
Mbong Amata - June
Blossom Chuks Chukwujekwu - George
Ben Touitou - Tony
Abiola Segun-Williams - Mrs Gracia

Plot
Eddie (Majid Michel) and June (Mbong Amata) share what seem to be the perfect marriage. Eddie began to lose control of his life when June had a fatal accident on a trip out of town. Eddie's junior brother Tony (Ben Touitou) appealed to June's best friend, Tobi (Beverly Naya) to help Eddie recover from the emotional breakdown from the death of his wife. Tobi eventually persuaded Eddie to join her dance group which eventually led to an emotional connection between them. Several months had gone by and, Eddie and Tobi finally decided to get married despite the reservation of Tobi about their union. It's about 2 years since June was involved in the accident and Tobi is now pregnant with Eddie's baby when June shockingly visited their matrimonial home explaining the circumstances regarding the accident and how Dr George (Blossom Chukwujekwu) saved her.

After several power tussle events between June and Tobi, Eddie finally decided to keep both of them as wives. after some consultations made by June with Eddie's colleagues she decides to return to George whom she refused to heed to his romantic advances towards her.

Reception 
Nollywood Reinvented gave it a 23% rating and was very critical about its unoriginal dialogues and recycled storylines it concluded by explaining that "I won’t deny that I was semi-excited about this movie when I originally heard of it. Why? Because even though I know better, a part of me still equates seeing Majid Michel’s face on a cast line-up with a guarantee for excellence and entertainment. I was wrong..."

See also
 List of Nigerian films of 2013

References

2013 films
English-language Nigerian films
2013 romantic drama films
Nigerian romantic drama films
2013 direct-to-video films
2010s English-language films